is the third album by High and Mighty Color, released on February 21, 2007. It comes in two editions, one featuring an additional DVD which contains most of the band's music videos.

Overview
Included on this album is a re-recording of "Dive into Yourself". A contest was held, with the voice of the winner to be included in the chorus of this version. The first press edition of the album comes with a "super picture label". The special edition DVD+CD release of the album contained all of the band's music videos except "Style ~Get Glory in This Hand~", which was left out for an unknown reason. When released, the album reached a weekly peak at number 16 and became the band's lowest selling album, lasting only one week on the Oricon top 20 chart.

Track listing
  – 4:24
  – 3:55
 "Dive into Yourself (Your Voice Version)" – 3:48
  – 4:10
  – 4:27
  – 4:25
 "The Moon Illuminates" – 3:57
 – 4:46
  – 3:59
  – 4:48
  – 4:30
 "Last Word" – 3:54
 "A Shape of Love" – 4:14
  – 5:12
 "Oxalis (Movie Version)" – 3:53

Bonus DVD
 "Ichirin no Hana"
 "Dive into Yourself"
 "Enrai ~Tooku ni Aru Akari~"
 "Tadoritsuku Basho"
 "Oxalis"
 "Omake"

All songs written by High and Mighty Color.

Personnel
 Mākī – vocals
 Yūsuke – vocals
 Meg – guitars
 Kazuto – guitars
 Sassy – drums
 Mackaz – bass

Charts
Album - Oricon Sales Chart (Japan)
Oricon Sales Chart (Japan)

References

High and Mighty Color albums
2007 albums